Finnish Swedish Heritage Day (Swedish: svenska dagen, Finnish: ruotsalaisuuden päivä) is a general flag flying day, which is celebrated in Finland on 6 November. The day celebrates the Swedish-speaking population of Finland, their culture, and the bilinguality of Finland.  The main celebrations are aired on the radio, and many smaller celebrations are held around Finland in schools. Usually, the song Modersmålets sång is sung, celebrating the mother tongue. The Finnish Swedish Heritage Day is celebrated on the same day as Gustavus Adolphus Day in Sweden, the day that king Gustavus Adolphus of Sweden was killed at the Battle of Lützen in 1632.

The Finland Swedish Heritage Day was created in 1908, when the newly founded Swedish People's Party of Finland decided to celebrate a day for the Swedes. The intention was to strengthen the Swedish-speaking Finnish community. The reason why the day of the death of king Gustavus Adolphus was chosen was because this also was the time when the empire of Sweden was founded. In the beginning, the celebrations largely circled around the king's persona. During the language strife of the 1930s the celebrations were overshadowed by street fights between Finnish and Swedish groups. Finnish-speaking students saw this day as a day for celebrating "aggressive imperialism". During the Second World War, both sides stopped fighting each other and emphasized that both language groups were part of Finland, thus the celebration of the day spread outside the political spectrum. Today, the day is led by Swedish Assembly of Finland.

References

Gustavus Adolphus of Sweden
Swedish culture
Society of Sweden 
Finnish culture
Society of Finland
November observances
Swedish diaspora
Autumn events in Finland
Finnish flag flying days